participated in the Junior Eurovision Song Contest 2021, held in Paris, France. Their entrant was Olena Usenko with the song "", who won the national selection organised by the Ukrainian broadcaster Suspilne.

Background 

In the  contest, Oleksandr Balabanov represented the country in Warsaw, Poland with the song the " (Open Up)", placing 7th out of 12 entries with 106 points.

Before Junior Eurovision

National final 
Suspilne announced on 21 June 2021 that Ukraine would be participating at the contest taking place in Paris, France. The broadcaster launched the selection process, with the final to be held on 23 October 2021, on 30 August 2021. Unlike the previous two years, where the national selections took place either online or behind closed doors, the final was the first one since 2017 to be televised live. Originally, the performances were also supposed to take place live, but due to the COVID-19 situation in Ukraine they were pre-recorded, which also caused the final to be pushed forward one day to 24 October, instead of the original date.

Competing entries 
The submissions were accepted from the announcement of the selection until 29 September 2021 with original songs or cover songs of Ukrainian Junior Eurovision entries between 2015 and 2020. On 5 October 2021, a professional jury selected 12 acts from 118 received submissions who proceeded to the national final. 8 original compositions and 4 artists with covers were selected to take part in the selection, with Suspilne holding a competition for the song performed by the four participants without an original song, won by the song "Save This World" composed by Marina Krut. Darya Rebrova, Daryna Kryvenko, Mariya Tkachuk, Olena Usenko and RREALINA (stage name of Anzhelina McFarlane) had all competed in previous Ukrainian national finals. On 23 October 2021, it was announced by the broadcaster that the song "Angel of Light" performed by RREALINA had been disqualified due to not obtaining the consent of the composer to participate in the final.

Final 
The contestants who entered with a cover song were assigned the song "Save This World" to perform in the final. The jury panel that was responsible for 5/6 of the final result consisted of: Alyosha (Ukrainian representative at the Eurovision Song Contest 2010),  (TV host and record producer), Liuba Morozova (musicologist), Ihor Panasov (editor-in-chief of Karabas Live) and Oleksandr Balabanov (Ukrainian representative at the Junior Eurovision Song Contest 2020).

At Junior Eurovision
After the opening ceremony, which took place on 13 December 2021, it was announced that Ukraine would perform twelfth on 19 December 2021, following Albania and preceding France.

At the end of the contest, Ukraine received 125 points, placing 6th out of 19 participating countries.

Voting

Detailed voting results

References 

Junior Eurovision Song Contest
Ukraine
2021